Kyle Andy P. Knoyle (born 24 September 1996) is an English footballer who plays as a right-back for League Two club Stockport County.

Knoyle began his career with West Ham United, making his debut in 2015, and was loaned by them to both Dundee United and Wigan Athletic. He joined Swindon Town in 2017 and then Cambridge in 2019 before joining Doncaster in 2021. He has represented the England under-18 team.

Club career

West Ham United
Knoyle spent five years with the West Ham United Academy before signing a two-year professional contract in June 2015. was first included in a West Ham matchday squad for their UEFA Europa League first qualifying round second leg fixture away to Lusitanos of Andorra on 9 July 2015, remaining an unused substitute in a 1–0 victory (4–0 aggregate). With manager Slaven Bilić putting priority on the team's Premier League performance, he made an array of changes for their third qualifying round second leg away to FC Astra Giurgiu on 6 August, including giving Knoyle his debut as a starter.

On 22 January 2016, Knoyle signed on loan for Dundee United until the end of the 2015–16 season. He made his Tangerines debut on 27 February as an 82nd-minute substitute for Blair Spittal in a 3–0 win at Ross County in the Scottish Premiership. His full debut came on 2 April in a 1–0 win at St Johnstone's McDiarmid Park.

On 1 July 2016, Knoyle joined Championship side Wigan Athletic on a season-long loan. In a pre-season training camp in Portugal, Knoyle suffered a dislocated and broken elbow in an accident, an injury which was expected to keep him out of the side for a lengthy period.

Knoyle was released by West Ham at the end of the 2016–17 season.

Swindon Town
Knoyle joined League Two club Swindon Town on 2 August 2017 on a free transfer. At the end of the 2017–18 season, Swindon exercised an option to extend his contract. He was offered a new contract by Swindon at the end of the 2018–19 season, which he turned down.

Cambridge United
Knoyle signed a two-year contract with League Two club Cambridge United on 5 June 2019. Following an impressive 2020–21 season, Knoyle was named in the 2020–21 EFL League Two Team of the Season at the league's annual awards ceremony.

Doncaster Rovers
On 17 June 2021, Knoyle signed for Doncaster Rovers on a two-year contract.

Stockport County
On 13 January 2023, Knoyle signed for Stockport County from Doncaster Rovers for an undisclosed fee on a two-and-a-half year contract.

International career
Knoyle made three appearances for the England under-18 team between 2013 and 2015.

Career statistics

Honours
Individual 
EFL League Two Team of the Season: 2020–21
PFA Team of the Year: 2020–21 League Two

References

External links

1996 births
Living people
English footballers
Association football defenders
West Ham United F.C. players
England youth international footballers
Dundee United F.C. players
Swindon Town F.C. players
Footballers from the London Borough of Newham
Scottish Professional Football League players
Wigan Athletic F.C. players
English Football League players
Cambridge United F.C. players
Doncaster Rovers F.C. players
Stockport County F.C. players